The Department of Antiquities (Greek: Τμήμα Αρχαιοτήτων) is a government department of the Republic of Cyprus with responsibility for archaeological research and cultural heritage management. It was established in 1935 by the British colonial government. The department is headed by the Director of the Department of Antiquities, next in line is the position of the Director of the Cyprus Museum and following that, the Curator of Monuments. It has conducted excavations at Khoirokoitia, Kition, Amathus, Kourion, Paphos, Salamis, Enkomi and carried multiple rescue excavations all around the island. The Department publishes yearly the Report of the Department of Antiquities Cyprus (RDAC) and the Annual Report of the Department of Antiquities Cyprus (ARDAC).

In 1955 the Director Peter Megaw established an Archaeological Survey Branch and appointed Hector Catling as the head and Kyriacos Nicolaou as an Assistant and a number of technicians. The Branch was discontinued in 1974.

The Department of Antiquities operates various archaeological sites such as Idalion, Kourion, Paphos Archaeological Park and museums like the Cyprus Museum, archaeological district museums of Paphos, Limassol, Kition and smaller local museums like the Hadjigeorgakis Kornesios Mansion.

Directors of the Department of Antiquities 

 John Robert Hilton (1934-1935)
Peter Megaw (1935-1960)
 Porphyrios Dikaios (1960-1963)
 Vassos Karageorghis (1963-1989)
 Athanasios Papageorgiou (1989-1991)
 Demos Christou (1991-1997)
 Sophocles Hadjisavvas
 Pavlos Flourentzos
 Maria Hadjicosti
 Marina Solomidou-Ieronymidou (current)

Curators of the Cyprus Museum 

 Menelaos Markides (1912-1931)
 Porphyrios Dikaios (1931-1960)
 Vassos Karageorghis (1960-1963)
Kyriakos Nicolaou (1964-1979)
 Despo Pilides (until 2021)

Assistant Curators of the Cyprus Museum 

 Porphyrios Dikaios (1929-1931)
 Vassos Karageorghis (1952-1960)
 Kyriakos Nicolaou (1961-1964)

Curators of Monuments 

 George H. Everett Jeffery
 Athanasios Papageorgiou (1962-1989)
 Maria Hadjicosti
Giorgos Filotheou
 Giorgos Georgiou

Inspectors of Antiquities 

 Joan du Plat Taylor
Rupert Gunnis

Archaeological Survey Officers 

 Hector Catling (1955-1959)
 Kyriakos Nicolaou

Publications 
The Department publishes the Report of the Department of Antiquities, Cyprus (RDAC) as well as the Annual Report of the Director of the Department of Antiquities Cyprus (ARDAC). The ARDAC for the years 2006-2009 can be accessed online.

See also 
 Department of Antiquities

References

External links 
 Official website (English)
 Official website (Greek)

Ministries established in 1935
Cyprus, Antiquities, Department of
Archaeology of Cyprus